Muş  "Sultan Alparslan" Airport  is an airport in Muş, Turkey.

Airlines and destinations
The following airlines operate regular scheduled and charter flights at Muş Airport:

Traffic Statistics 

(*)Source: DHMI.gov.tr

References

External links
 

 

Airports in Turkey
Muş
Buildings and structures in Muş Province
Transport in Muş Province